Eucalyptus hallii, commonly known as Goodwood gum, is a species of small to medium-sized tree that is endemic to Queensland. It has smooth bark, lance-shaped to curved adult leaves, flower buds in groups of seven, white flower and conical fruit.

Description
It has smooth white and grey bark that is shed to reveal pale orange to pale pink.

Taxonomy and naming
Eucalyptus hallii was first formally described in 1975 by Ian Brooker from a specimen he collected near Goodwood railway station. The description was published in the journal Australian Forest Research. The specific epithet honours Norman Hall, who collaborated with Brooker and initiated the first edition of the book, Forest Trees of Australia.

Distribution and habitat
Goodwood gum grow in woodland and open forest, usually in flat areas, between Bundaberg and Maryborough in Queensland.

Conservation status
This eucalypt is listed as "vulnerable" under the Australian Government Environment Protection and Biodiversity Conservation Act 1999 and the Queensland Government Nature Conservation Act 1992. The main threat to the species is habitat loss due to agricultural activities.

See also

List of Eucalyptus species

References

Trees of Australia
hallii
Myrtales of Australia
Flora of Queensland
Taxa named by Ian Brooker
Plants described in 1975